Suat Serdar (born 11 April 1997) is a German professional footballer who plays as a midfielder for Bundesliga club Hertha BSC.

Club career

Mainz
Serdar made his Bundesliga debut on 18 September 2015 against TSG 1899 Hoffenheim replacing Yunus Mallı after 88 minutes in a 3–1 home win.

Schalke
On 17 May 2018, it was announced that Serdar would be joining Schalke 04 on a four-year contract. Many people consider that Serdar was Schalke's best player during the 2019/20 season.

Hertha

On 15 June 2021, Serdar signed a five-year contract with Hertha BSC. He made his debut in the DFB-Pokal first round against SV Meppen, as Hertha advanced following a late goal in a 1–0 victory. His league debut followed on 15 August in a 3–1 loss away against 1. FC Köln. He tested positive for SARS‑CoV‑2 amid its pandemic.

International career
He represented Germany at the U16, 17, 18, 19 and 20 levels.

He made his Germany national team debut on 9 October 2019 in a friendly against Argentina. He replaced Serge Gnabry in the 72nd minute.

Career statistics

Club

International

References

External links

Profile at the Hertha BSC website

1997 births
Living people
German people of Turkish descent
People from Bingen am Rhein
German footballers
Footballers from Rhineland-Palatinate
Association football midfielders
Germany youth international footballers
Germany under-21 international footballers
Germany international footballers
Bundesliga players
3. Liga players
BFV Hassia Bingen players
1. FSV Mainz 05 players
1. FSV Mainz 05 II players
FC Schalke 04 players
Hertha BSC players